Hexeretmis willineri is a moth of the family Alucitidae. It is found in Bolivia.

References

Moths described in 1954
Alucitidae